Samuele Vita Zelman (1808, Trieste – 1885, Trieste) was an Italian Jewish writer and poet.

Zelman was educated at the rabbinical college of Padua, where he was the favourite pupil of Samuel David Luzzatto. He was the author of the following works: Kinah on the death of S. D. Luzzatto (Padua, 1865); Primi discorsi di Rab Melza (Trieste, 1854); Le Parole di un ignorante ai dotti, directed against demagogic writers (Trieste, 1855); and Ha-nitzanim, a collection of Hebrew poems (Trieste, 1883). A complete edition of his Hebrew essays, hymns, letters, elegiac poems, etc., was published by Vittorio Castiglione under the title Ne'im zemirot Shemuel, o, yelid kinor (Trieste, 1886). Some of his Hebrew poems are contained in the periodicals Bikkure ha-'ittim (vol. xi.) and Mosé (vols. v. and viii.).

Selected bibliography

References 

1808 births
1885 deaths
19th-century Italian Jews
19th-century Italian poets
Italian male poets
Hebrew-language poets
Writers from Trieste
19th-century Italian male writers